is a formal term that encompasses both poultry and non-poultry items, skewered and grilled.

Yakitori and kushiyaki 

Both yakitori and kushiyaki are used interchangeably in Japanese society to refer to skewered meat collectively; however, when referring to a specific item, yakitori will not be used unless the primary meat is chicken.

While kabayaki is also skewered and grilled over charcoal, it is rarely categorized as kushiyaki since they are not served on skewers.
Fish grilled whole on skewers with salt and served after pulling off the skewer including sea bream (tai) and sweetfish (ayu) is not called kushiyaki but shioyaki ("grilled with salt") at high-end restaurants. At food stalls or yatai, ayu is sold on skewers.

Variety 
In order to facilitate even cooking, the ingredient is cut into small, roughly uniform shapes. Skewers or kushi are made with bamboo or Japanese cypress, and shape as well as length varies to use for the type of food: flat skewers are used for minced meat, for example.
 Meat
 beef (gyūniku), pork meat (butaniku) and cartilage (nankotsu), horse meat (baniku). 
 Seafood
 sweetfish (ayu), minced and seasoned Atlantic horse mackerel (aji) and sardine (iwashi), prawn and shrimp (ebi), Japanese scallop (hotate), squid and cuttlefish (ika).
 Vegetable
 onion (tamanegi), eggplant (nasu), cherry tomato, potato, pumpkin (kabocha), scallion (negi), ginkgo nuts (ginnan), green bell pepper (pīman), garlic (ninniku), Japanese pepper (shishitō).
 Products and prepared
 Tōfu, nattō, steamed rice.

Seasoning
Kushiyaki seasonings are primarily divided among two types: salty or salty-sweet. The salty type usually uses plain salt as its main seasoning. For the salty-sweet variety, tare, a special sauce consisting of mirin, sake, soy sauce, and sugar is used. Other common spices include powdered cayenne pepper, shichimi, Japanese pepper, black pepper, karashi and wasabi, according to one's tastes.

Examples

Products and prepared food are applied for receipt.
, bell pepper stuffed with minced pork
, cherry tomato wrapped with bacon strips
, fried thin tofu (aburaage) pouch filled with nattō
, beef tongue, sliced thinly.
, Pork belly
, thicker variety of deep-fried tōfu
, enoki mushrooms wrapped in slices of pork
, asparagus wrapped in bacon

Gallery

See also

 Japanese cuisine
 List of chicken dishes
 Robatayaki
 Similar skewered food

References

Further reading

External links

 Japan Guide
 Everyday Japanese Cuisine

Japanese beef dishes
Japanese pork dishes
Grilled skewers
Street food
Japanese cuisine terms